Tuft is a surname. Notable people with the name include:

Arne Tuft (1911-1989), Norwegian cross country skier
Gabbi Tuft or Tyler Reks (born 1978), American professional wrestler
Svein Tuft (born 1977), bicycle racer

See also
Toft (disambiguation), include a list of people with surname Toft
Tofte (disambiguation), includes a list of people with surname Tofte
Tufte, surname
Tufts (surname)

Norwegian-language surnames